USA-272, or Wideband Global SATCOM 8 (WGS-8) is a United States military communications satellite operated by the United States Air Force as part of the Wideband Global SATCOM programme. Launched in 2016, it was the eighth WGS satellite to reach orbit. It is stationed at a longitude of 135° West, in geostationary orbit. WGS-8 was procured by the United States Air Force.

Overview 
The WGS system is a constellation of highly capable military communications satellites that leverage cost-effective methods and technological advances in the communications satellite industry. The WGS system is composed of three principal segments: Space Segment (satellites), Control Segment (operators) and Terminal Segment (users). Each WGS satellite provides service in multiple frequency bands, with the unprecedented ability to cross-band between the two frequencies on board the satellite. WGS augments other satellites.

In early 2001, a satellite communications industry team led by Boeing Satellite Systems was selected to develop the Wideband Gapfiller Satellite (WGS) system as successors to the Defense Satellite Communications System (DSCS) series of communications satellites. This satellite communications system is intended to support the warfighter with newer and far greater capabilities than provided by current systems. In March 2007, the acronym WGS was changed to Wideband Global SATCOM.

Just one WGS satellite provides more SATCOM capacity than the entire legacy Defense Satellite Communications System (DSCS) constellation.

As the backbone of the U.S. military's global satellite communications, Wideband Global SATCOM (WGS) satellite system provides flexible, high-capacity communications for the Nation's warfighters through procurement and operation of the satellite constellation and the associated control systems. WGS provides worldwide flexible, high data rate and long haul communications for the Department of Defense (DoD), governmental organizations and international partners.

Satellite description 
The order for long lead items for WGS-8 was placed in September 2011. The final contract for this satellite was awarded in December 2011, together with long lead items for WGS-9 and an option for WGS-10. Built by Boeing Satellite Systems, WGS-8 is based on the BSS-702HP satellite bus. The spacecraft is equipped with two solar panels to generate power for its communications payload, which consists of cross-band X-band and Ka-band transponders. Propulsion is provided by an R-4D-15 apogee motor, with four XIPS-25 ion engines for stationkeeping. In 2012, the cost of the WGS-8 spacecraft was estimated at US$354 million.

Launch 
WGS-8 was launched by United Launch Alliance (ULA), who placed it into orbit using a Delta IV M+ (5,4) launch vehicle, flight number D376. The launch took place from Space Launch Complex 37B (SLC-37B) at the Cape Canaveral Air Force Station (CCAFS), with liftoff at 23:52 UTC on 7 December 2016. The launch was successful, placing the WGS-8 into a geostationary transfer orbit (GTO), from which the spacecraft raised itself into geostationary orbit using its onboard propulsion system. The satellite was designated USA-272 under the U.S. military's designation system, and received the International Designator 2016-075A and Satellite Catalog Number 41879.

References 

Spacecraft launched in 2016
USA satellites
Wideband Global SATCOM
Communications satellites in geostationary orbit